Hopewell Township is one of the twenty-five townships of Muskingum County, Ohio, United States.  The 2000 census found 3,038 people in the township, 2,947 of whom lived in the unincorporated portions of the township.

Geography
Located on the western edge of the county, it borders the following townships:
Licking Township - north
Falls Township - east, north of Springfield Township
Springfield Township - east, south of Falls Township
Newton Township - southeast
Madison Township, Perry County - south
Hopewell Township, Perry County - southwest corner
Bowling Green Township, Licking County - west, south of Hopewell Township
Hopewell Township, Licking County - west, north of Bowling Green Township
Hanover Township, Licking County - northwest corner

Part of the village of Gratiot is located in western Hopewell Township, and the unincorporated community of Hopewell lies at the center of the township.

Name and history
It is one of five Hopewell Townships statewide.

Hopewell Township was described in 1833 as having four churches and three physicians.

Government

The township is governed by a three-member board of trustees, who are elected in November of odd-numbered years to a four-year term beginning on the following January 1. Two are elected in the year after the presidential election and one is elected in the year before it. There is also an elected township fiscal officer, who serves a four-year term beginning on April 1 of the year after the election, which is held in November of the year before the presidential election. Vacancies in the fiscal officership or on the board of trustees are filled by the remaining trustees.

References

External links
County website

Townships in Muskingum County, Ohio
Townships in Ohio